House guest or HouseGuest or houseguest or variant, may refer to:

 Houseguest (film), 1995 U.S. comedy film
 Houseguest (band), U.S. rock band
 HouseGuest, contestants on the Big Brother (TV series) reality TV show franchise
 House Guest (TV series), 2008 UK reality TV series
 House Guests (band), U.S. funk band
 "House Guest", 1962 episode of Alfred Hitchcock Presents

See also
 Guest in the House (film), 1944 U.S. film noir
 Guest house (disambiguation)